was an Okinawan martial artist who was the grand master of the Shorin-ryu Shido-kan style of Okinawan Karate and the president of the Okinawa Shorin-ryu Karate Association.  He was ranked Hanshi, 10th Dan.  Miyahira created the Shido-kan branch of Kobayashi Shorin-ryu after the death of his teacher, Chōshin Chibana.  Miyahira was also instructed by Anbun Tokuda and Choki Motobu.

References

1918 births
2010 deaths
Okinawan male karateka
Shōrin-ryū practitioners